Rhizopodomyces is a genus of fungi in the family Laboulbeniaceae. The genus contain 7 species.

References

External links
Rhizopodomyces at Index Fungorum

Laboulbeniomycetes